The Guayas River also called Rio Guayas is a major river in western Ecuador. It gives name to Guayas Province and is the most important river in South America that does not flow into the Atlantic Ocean or any of its marginal seas. Its total length, including the Daule River, is 389 km (241 mi). The Guayas River's drainage basin is 34,500 sq.km (13,320 sq.mi) and it has an average discharge of 70,000 cu ft/s (1,982 m3/s). It is the national river of Ecuador and is present on the Coat of Arms.

Geography

Course

The Guayas River has one of its sources in the Andes and the Chimborazo (volcano), Ecuador's highest volcano.  The coat of arms of Ecuador shows an image of the river descending from the mountain.  Guayas is the name of the lower part of the river, which starts at the confluence of the Daule River from the west and the Babahoyo River from the east, between the cities of Guayaquil and Durán, in Guayas province.  The Guayas River then flows around Santay Island, and becomes one current again.  From the confluence to the delta 60 kilometers away, it borders Guayaquil (canton) and Durán cantons, and Guayaquil and Naranjal cantons, just before the delta.

Delta
The Guayas River forms a very complex delta. Its most important feature is the existence of a slough called Estero Salado, surrounded by swamps and affected by tides. The area between the Guayas River and the Estero Salado forms a maze of islands, some of which have been transformed into slums. The Cobina Slough connects the Estero Salado with the river.

The main course of the river is affected by tides, and forms a small group of islands; the most important of them is Mondragón. The river then meets the Gulf of Guayaquil, an inlet of the Pacific Ocean. Its influence is noticeable in the Puná Island, and in the Jambelí Strait, in the province of El Oro.

Watershed
The Guayas River has the largest watershed in South America west of the Andes mountains that flows into the Pacific Ocean. It has an area 34,500 km², in nine provinces: Los Ríos, Guayas, Bolívar, Manabí, Cañar, Pichincha, Azuay, Chimborazo and Cotopaxi. In collaboration with the Estero Salado, the river discharges 36 billion cubic meters of water into the Gulf of Guayaquil every year.

Cities along the river

Cities along the Daule River

Pichincha
Balzar
Colimes
Palestina
Santa Lucía
Daule
Nobol
Guayaquil

Cities along the Babahoyo River
Babahoyo
Samborondón
Durán

Cities along the Guayas River
Guayaquil
Durán

See also
National symbols of Ecuador

References

Rivers of Ecuador
Geography of Guayas Province